Alien vs. Predator (also known as Aliens versus Predator and AVP) is a science-fiction action horror
media franchise created by comic book writers Randy Stradley and Chris Warner. The series is a crossover between, and part of, the larger Alien and Predator franchises, depicting the two species as being in conflict with one another. It began as a comic book series in 1989, before being adapted into a video game series in the 1990s. Produced and distributed by 20th Century Fox, the film series began with Alien vs. Predator (2004), directed by Paul W. S. Anderson, and was followed by Aliens vs. Predator: Requiem (2007), directed by the Brothers Strause, and the development of a third film has been delayed indefinitely. The series has led to numerous novels, comics, and video game spin-offs such as Aliens vs. Predator released in 2010.

Premise
The Alien vs. Predator franchise depicts a series of deadly encounters between humanity and other extraterrestrial species: the Aliens, ferocious, endoparasitoid creatures; and the Predators, technologically advanced warriors that hunt for personal sport and honor. Predominantly transpiring in the present day of the 21st century, the series acts as a spin-off to both the Alien franchise and the Predator franchise, portraying humankind's encounters with alien species and how they helped shape the human civilization and weaponry such as the Colonel  Marines, the United America, and those involved with the Weyland-Yutani Corporation that is seen in the Alien franchise of the future.

Throughout the series, audiences see the involvement of the forerunners of the Weyland-Yutani Corporation in the history of these alien creatures as Weyland Industries, headed by Charles Bishop Weyland (one of the many within the Weyland family), who seeks immortality and the advancement of the company, whereas the Yutani Corporation, headed by Ms. Yutani, seeks to study creatures from space and acquire their technology and weaponry for organized warfare. Amidst the actions of the two corporations, human characters are forced to survive infestations of Xenomorphs and clashes with Yautjas, eventually leading to the future merger between the two companies and the development of interstellar travel and eventually wars with other races from space and other advanced technologies.

Background
The first Alien vs. Predator story was published by Dark Horse Comics in Dark Horse Presents #34–36 (November 1989 – February 1990). In November 1990, Predator 2 was released in theaters and included a scene depicting an Alien (Xenomorph) skull as one of the Predator's trophies. Over the coming years, Fox had been pursuing a cinematic adaptation of the concept to advance the Alien and Predator franchises further, and Peter Briggs was tasked with the job to write an early script for the project and eventually pitched an idea titled The Hunt: Alien vs. Predator in 1994, but the pitch was rejected and development of the film remained stuck in development hell for almost a decade before the first feature film was finally released in 2004 under the helm of Paul W. S. Anderson, titled Alien vs. Predator, with a sequel by the Brothers Strause, titled Aliens vs. Predator: Requiem, eventually released in 2007. Ellen Ripley does not appear in this franchise, as it takes place more than a century prior to the events of the Alien series.

The first actor to be cast for Alien vs. Predator was Lance Henriksen, who played the characters Bishop and Michael Bishop Weyland in Aliens and Alien 3 (and Aliens: Colonial Marines). Although the Alien films are set 150 years in the future, Anderson wanted to keep continuity with the series by including a familiar actor. Henriksen plays billionaire and self-taught-engineer Charles Bishop Weyland, a character that ties in with the Weyland-Yutani Corporation as the original founder and CEO of Weyland Industries. Henriksen later returned to the franchise through the role of Karl Bishop Weyland, a descendant of Charles Weyland, in the 2010 video game Aliens vs. Predator.

According to Anderson, Weyland becomes known for the discovery of the pyramid, and as a result the Weyland-Yutani Corporation models the Bishop android in the Alien films after him; "when the Bishop android is created in 150 years time, it's created with the face of the creator. It's kind of like Microsoft building an android in 100 years time that has the face of Bill Gates." The Brothers Strause further stated how the ending of their sequel built further upon establishing the future of the universe by having the Predator technology acquired by Yutani Corporation (and by extension Project Stargazer of the Predator films) act as the impetus for the development of advanced technologies such as FTL (faster-than-light travel) drives fitted aboard spaceships.

The legacy of the shared universe has also shown itself in later films. In the 2010 film Predators, when the group of main protagonists enters the Predators' camp, there is a brief view of an Alien skull on the ground (as well as the lower jaw of an Alien on the helmet of the Berserker Predator), referring to the similar moment from Predator 2 when an Alien skull is seen in the trophy room of the Predator spaceship. Furthermore, the 2018 film titled The Predator featured several references to Alien vs. Predator such as the shurikens, mask designs, and Alexa's spear which the Predator named Scar made out of an Alien tail. An alternate ending for The Predator displaying a Weyland-Yutani Corp pod containing Ripley and Newt from Aliens (both played by Breanna Watkins) wearing a Weyland-Yutani breathing apparatus shaped like an Alien Facehugger was also intended to further connect to the Alien films.

Films

Alien vs. Predator (2004)

In 2004, a Predator mothership arrives in Earth orbit to draw humans to an ancient Predator training ground on Bouvetøya, an island about one thousand miles north of Antarctica. A buried pyramid giving off a "heat bloom" attracts a group of explorers led by billionaire and self-taught engineer Charles Bishop Weyland (Lance Henriksen), the original founder and CEO of Weyland Industries, who unknowingly activates an Alien egg production line as a hibernating Alien Queen is awakened within the pyramid. Three Predators descend unto the planet and enter the structure, killing all humans in their way with the intention of hunting the newly formed Aliens, while the scattered explorers are captured alive by Aliens and implanted with embryos. Two Predators die in the ensuing battle with an Alien, while the third allies itself with the lone surviving human, Alexa "Lex" Woods (Sanaa Lathan), while making their way out of the pyramid as it is destroyed by the Predator's wrist bomb and eventually does battle with the escaped Alien Queen on the surface. The Queen is defeated by being dragged down by a water tower into the dark depths of the frozen sea, but not before she fatally wounds the last Predator. The orbiting Predator mothership uncloaks and the crew retrieves the fallen Predator. A Predator elder gives Lex a spear as a sign of respect, and then departs. Once in orbit it is revealed that an Alien Chestburster was present within the corpse, thus a Predalien hybrid is born.

Aliens vs. Predator: Requiem (2007)

Set immediately after the events of the previous film, the Predalien hybrid aboard the Predator scout ship, having just separated from the mothership shown in the previous film, has grown to full adult size and sets about killing the Predators aboard the ship, causing it to crash in the small town of Gunnison, Colorado. The last surviving Predator activates a distress beacon containing a video recording of the Predalien, which is received by a veteran Predator on the Predator homeworld, who sets off towards Earth to "clean up" the infestation. When it arrives, the Predator tracks the Aliens into a section of the sewer below the town. He removes evidence of their presence as he moves along using a corrosive blue liquid and uses a laser net to try to contain the creatures, but the Aliens still manage to escape into the town above. The Predator fashions a plasma pistol from its remaining plasma caster and hunts Aliens all across town, accidentally cutting the power to the town in the process. During a confrontation with human survivors, the Predator loses its plasma pistol. The Predator then fights the Predalien singlehandedly, and the two mortally wound one another just as the US air force drops a tactical nuclear bomb on the town, incinerating both combatants along with the Predalien's warriors and hive, as well as the few remaining humans in the town. The salvaged plasma pistol is then taken to a Ms. Yutani of the Yutani Corporation, foreshadowing an advancement in technology leading to the future events of the Alien films.

Future
Colin and Greg Strause were adamant that they wanted to develop Alien vs. Predator 3 during the production of Aliens vs. Predator: Requiem. They essentially sought to make an AVP-film in space and set in the future, but by the time they were hired, 20th Century Fox had already decided to go with Salerno's script set on Earth. They incorporated elements of their ideas into the second film, such as the Predator home planet. In 2008 "An anonymous source over at 20th Century Fox got in touch with us over the weekend to relay the news another Aliens vs. Predator sequel is a 'certainty' at this point. If you recall, the brothers Strause – who helmed the Christmas release Aliens vs. Predator: Requiem – stated Fox was going to take a 'wait-and-see' approach to a third chapter, furthermore, that the story would have to continue in space."

On October 28, 2010, io9 published an exclusive interview with the Brothers Strause in which they revealed that Alien vs. Predator 3 would have led directly into Alien. Greg Strause stated that, "The original ending for AVPR, that we pitched them, ended up on the Alien homeward [sic], and actually going from the Predator gun, that you see at the end, it was going to transition from that gun to a logo of a Weyland-Yutani spaceship that was heading to an alien planet. And then we were actually going to cut down to the surface [of the alien planet] and you were going to see a hunt going on. It was going to be a whole tribe of predators going against this creature that we called "King Alien." It's this huge giant winged alien thing. And that was going to be the lead-in, to show that the fact that the Predator gun [at the end of AVPR] is the impetus of all the technological advancements that allowed humans to travel in space. Which leads up to the Alien timeline."

When asked about the ending sequence of Aliens vs. Predator: Requiem, that the Predator-weapon handed to Ms. Yutani would lead to us humans developing advanced space travel technology, Greg stated, "That was the idea. They never got any of the equipment from the first Predators. It's the first time they ever received any intact working technology left over. So they could take that and reverse engineer, figure out what the power source was – all of those things. And in theory, that would enable that company [Weyland-Yutani] to make massive advancements in technology and dominate the space industry. That was the whole idea, was to literally continue from Ms. Yutani getting the gun – and then cut to 50 years in the future, and there's spaceships now. We've made a quantum leap in space travel. That was going to set up the ending, which would then set up what AVP was going to be, which would take place 100 years in the future. That was kind of the plan."

Liam O'Donnell, who worked as a visual effects consultant on Requiem, wrote a script treatment for AVP3 during the production of Requiem which was set in South Africa about fifty years in the future when global warming had melted the ice caps (and releasing the Alien Queen from Antarctica), featuring the merger and global rule of the Weyland-Yutani Corporation and their development of interstellar travel based on the recovered Predator technology from Gunnison.

In 2015, having worked on the special effects of Aliens vs. Predator: Requiem, VFX make-up artist David Woodruff (the son of Tom Woodruff who worked on both the Alien- and Terminator-franchises) participated in an interview with TheTerminatorFans, and when asked about the situation of a third chapter in the AVP-trilogy, he stated, "I haven't heard anything about a 3rd installment, not even rumors. This Neill Blomkamp project is the first possibility I've seen or heard of another Alien film and I'm all about it. I know the guys at Amalgamated Dynamics are pushing for something like this too. It's time."

In 2015, during the London Film and Comic Con, Sigourney Weaver stated that she asked to have Ripley killed in Alien 3 because she knew that Fox were moving forward with Alien vs. Predator. Peter Briggs (writer of The Hunt: Alien vs. Predator) responded by praising all films in the franchise and pointing out that the AVP-films were more successful than Weaver's last two Alien-films, and noting that "There's a terrific Alien vs. Predator movie still to be made by someone. It just hasn't happened yet."

In mid-2018, Shane Black, the director of The Predator, tweeted his belief that a third Alien vs. Predator can still happen, indicating the studio's interest in both franchises. A ComicBookRumours.com article from July suggested Fox may attempt an "AVP Cinematic Universe" after Ridley Scott finishes making the Alien prequels, after which Fox considered a "soft reboot" to the Alien series with new/original characters, a new setting, and new timeline, which the same article also suggested, if it were to happen, could potentially take place within the same continuity as the Predator films and AVP films. Noting Predators featured an Alien skull cameo (along with other references to Aliens) and Lex Wood's Xenomorph tail spear from Alien vs. Predator make appearance in The Predator. Alternate endings produced for The Predator displaying a Weyland-Yutani Corp pod containing Ripley and Newt (both played by Breanna Watkins) wearing a Weyland-Yutani breathing apparatus shaped like an Alien Facehugger was also intended to further connect to the Alien films. In 2020, Alex Litvak, the co-writer of Predators revealed the original script for the film's cancelled sequel, which would feature the Colonial Marines from Aliens.

Cast and crew

Principal cast

A  indicates the actor or actress lent only his or her voice for his or her film character.
A  indicates a cameo appearance.
A dark gray cell indicates the character was not in the film.

Additional crew

Reception

Box office performance

Critical and public response
The Alien vs. Predator duology has received a negative critical response, with the primary source of criticism being the plot, lighting and editing.

Accolades

Music

"Wach auf!" from German industrial metal group Oomph!'s appeared in the German version of Aliens vs. Predator: Requiem and was released as a single to tie-in with the film.

Home media

Other media
There exists a great number of spin-offs in other media, including a large number of crossovers within the Alien/Predator fictional universe.

Novels

Several novelizations based upon the movies have been released.
 Alien vs. Predator: The Movie Novelization (2004) by Marc Cerasini
 Alien vs. Predator: Armageddon (2016) by Tim Lebbon
 Machiko Noguchi
 Aliens vs. Predator: Prey (1994) by Steve Perry
 Aliens vs. Predator: Hunter's Planet (1994) by Dave Bischoff
 Aliens vs. Predator: War (1999) by S.D. Perry
 The Complete Aliens vs. Predator Omnibus – collects Prey, Hunter's Planet and War (Titan Books, November 2016)

Comic books

Dark Horse Comics published various lines based on the franchise, starring character of Machiko Noguchi. The Fire and Stone (2014–2015) and Life and Death (2016–2017) series crosses over the continuities of Alien vs. Predator and  Prometheus with graphic novel sequels. Marvel Comics acquired the comic book rights to the Alien vs. Predator franchise in 2020, in addition to the rights to the Alien and Predator franchises at the request of Disney.

Books
Other books expanding this fictional universe has been released through the years, and also such that depict the background to the films, including works by special effects company Amalgamated Dynamics Incorporated (ADI) which has worked with both the Alien, Predator, and Alien vs. Predator films.
 Aliens versus Predator: Prima's Official Strategy Guide (1999)
 Aliens versus Predator: Gold Edition: Prima's Official Strategy Guide (2000)
 Aliens versus Predator 2: Prima's Official Strategy Guide (2001)
 Alien vs. Predator: The Creature Effects of ADI (by Alec Gillis and Tom Woodruff, Jr., Design Studio Press, August 2004)
 Aliens/Predator: Panel to Panel (2006)
 Aliens vs. Predator: Requiem – Inside the Monster Shop (by Alec Gillis and Tom Woodruff, Jr., Design Studio Press, December 2007, Titan Books, January 2008)
 Aliens vs. Predator: Bradygames Official Strategy Guide (2010)
 Aliens vs. Predators: Ultimate Prey (2022)
 Aliens vs. Predators: Rift War (2022)

Video games

The 1993 SFC beat 'em up Alien vs. Predator was developed by Jorudan and Published by Activision (NA, PAL) and IGS (JP).

Game Boy version Alien vs Predator: The Last of His Clan was Developed by ASK Kodansha.

An Alien vs. Predator arcade beat 'em up game was released by Capcom in 1994. Two other Alien vs Predator games were also published by Activision for the SNES and Game Boy in 1993. There were also several Alien vs. Predator mobile games, and two cancelled titles for the Atari Lynx and Game Boy Advance.

In 1994, Atari Corporation released the Rebellion Developments-developed first-person shooter Alien vs Predator for the Atari Jaguar, in which one could play as an Alien, Marine, or Predator. Rebellion then went on to develop the similarly themed 1999's Aliens versus Predator for the PC. This was followed by, among others, Aliens versus Predator 2 and the expansion pack Aliens versus Predator 2: Primal Hunt. In 2010, Sega released a reboot, Aliens vs. Predator, a multiplatform first-person shooter also made by Rebellion and tied into the timeline of the live-action films.

In 2003 a real-time strategy game "Alien Versus Predator: Extinction" was made for the PS2 and Xbox featuring 3 campaign modes for both races as well as humans. It featured several variations of Predators and Aliens seen throughout the films and other forms of media including the famous Predalien.

Both Alien and Predator appear as downloadable characters in Mortal Kombat X (2015).

The film series' characters of Predators in the franchise appeared in the video game Predator: Hunting Grounds (2020).

Pinball
Zen Studios developed and released a virtual pinball based upon the 1986 film Aliens, the 2004 film Alien vs. Predator, and the 2014 video game Alien: Isolation in the Aliens vs. Pinball collection, available as an add-on pack for Zen Pinball 2, Pinball FX 2 and Pinball FX 3 on April 26, 2016. The three tables features 3-D animated figures of Ellen Ripley, Alexa Woods, Amanda Ripley, the Alien, and the Predator.

Board games
 Aliens/Predator (1997)
 Aliens vs. Predator: Alien Resurrection Expansion Set (1998)
 Aliens vs. Predator (2010)
 AVP: The Hunt Begins (2015) – In 2013, Prodos obtained the license from 20th Century Fox to do a boardgame and successfully funded it on Kickstarter.
 AVP: Alien Warriors (2015)
 Clue: Alien vs. Predator (2016)
 AVP: Unleashed (2017)
 AVP: Evolved Aliens (2018)
 AVP: Hot Landing Zone (2019)

Action figures
During the 1980s and 1990s, Halcyon Models released seventeen Alien model kits, beginning in 1987, as well as a Predator 2 model kit in 1994.

In 1994, Kenner released a collection of action figures known as Aliens vs. Predator. This followed the two initial series of Aliens that were based on an animated series, Operation: Aliens, that was never broadcast. As such, the inclusion of Predator is often considered the 3rd and 4th series of the Aliens line. This collection includes several Aliens, many of which feature built-in attack features, and Predators, which include removable masks and battle weapons such as spears and missile launchers. The figures generally possess 5 points of articulation, and some include a mini Dark Horse comic book.

While the collection as a whole is known as Aliens vs. Predator, the two character types have their own card art that only features the character at hand. An exception would be the Aliens vs. Predator 2-pack. Since human space marines were included in the initial Aliens line, the Predator was marketed as an alternative enemy to the Aliens. A figure cardback reads: "The stage is set for the universe's two most ferocious enemies. It's the gruesome and evil Aliens against the big-game hunter Predator. Who will win... the beast or the hunter? Can the Predator stop the evil Aliens before the galaxy is destroyed?!?!?!"

In 1998, Kay Bee Toys released the Kenner produced Aliens: Hive Wars line featuring Aliens, Marines, and Predators. More figures, including a female Predator and an Alien/Predator/Smash Mason 3-pack, were designed for this series but never released as part of the line.

Six sets of Aliens and Predator Micro Machines were also planned by Galoob in 1995 but never released. This would have also included the LV-426/Outer World Station Action Fleet Playset. Thanks in part to the research of toy collectors, many photos of these unreleased toys and prototypes have shown up online in recent years.

In December 2002, McFarlane Toys released a highly detailed Alien vs. Predator deluxe set. In 2004, they produced a series of figures based on the Alien vs. Predator film. Alongside the articulated figures, McFarlane also released statuesque display sets depicting scenes from the film.

Hot Toys produced highly detailed 16" tall figures for every film including Aliens vs. Predator: Requiem in 2007.

NECA has produced various lines of Alien vs. Predator figures for several years. In 2007, they released two series of Requiem figures.

In 2013, a line of ReAction Figures Alien and Predator toys were produced.

Originally having produced figures based on the 2013 video game Aliens: Colonial Marines, Hiya Toys has also released figures based on Predator, Predator 2, and Alien: Covenant.

Funko Pop! Vinyl currently produces ongoing lines of Alien vs. Predator figures.

Minimates produces ongoing lines of Alien vs. Predator figures.

Loot Crate and Titans Vinyl Figures have collaborated in producing several figures and other merchandise based on characters and creatures from the Alien vs. Predator universe.

Eaglemoss Collections currently produces the ongoing Alien & Predator line of figures based on characters and creatures from the Alien vs. Predator universe.

Theme park attractions
On August 4, 2014, Universal Studios confirmed that there will be haunted mazes based on Alien vs. Predator for their Halloween Horror Nights events at both Universal Studios Hollywood and Universal Studios Florida.

See also

 Alien franchise
 Predator franchise
 List of space science fiction franchises
 List of films featuring extraterrestrials
 List of monster movies

References

Further reading
 Beautiful Monsters: The Unofficial and Unauthorised Guide to the Alien and Predator Films (by David A. McIntee, Telos, 272 pages, 2005)

External links
 
 
 Alien vs. Predator Central

 
Mass media franchises introduced in 1989
Alien (franchise)
Predator (franchise)
American film series
Action film franchises
Horror film franchises
Horror mass media franchises
Science fiction film franchises
Science fiction horror film series
Film series introduced in 2004
20th Century Studios franchises
Films adapted into comics
Dark Horse Comics adapted into films
Dark Horse Comics adapted into video games
Crossover fiction